The 5th Jutra Awards were held on February 23, 2003 to honour films made with the participation of the Quebec film industry in 2002.

Winners and nominees

References

2003 in Quebec
Jutra
05
2002 in Canadian cinema